Fellowship of the Royal Society of Edinburgh (FRSE) is an award granted to individuals that the Royal Society of Edinburgh, Scotland's national academy of science and letters, judged to be "eminently distinguished in their subject". This society received a royal charter in 1783, allowing for its expansion.

Elections
Around 50 new fellows are elected each year in March.  there are around 1,650 Fellows, including 71 Honorary Fellows and 76 Corresponding Fellows.

Fellows are entitled to use the post-nominal letters FRSE, Honorary Fellows HonFRSE, and Corresponding Fellows CorrFRSE.

Disciplines 
The Fellowship is split into four broad sectors, covering the full range of physical and life sciences, arts, humanities, social sciences, education, professions, industry, business and public life.

A: Life sciences

 A1: Biomedical and cognitive sciences
 A2: Clinical sciences
 A3: Organismal and environmental biology
 A4: Cell and molecular biology

B: Physical, engineering and informatic sciences

 B1: Physics and astronomy
 B2: Earth sciences and chemistry
 B3: Engineering
 B4: Informatics, mathematics and statistics

C: Arts, humanities and social sciences

 C1: Language, literature and history
 C2: Philosophy, theology and law
 C3: History, theory and practice of the creative and performing arts
 C4: Economics and social sciences

D: Business, public service and public engagement

 D1: Public engagement and understanding
 D2: Professional, educational and public sector leadership
 D3: Private sector leadership

Notable fellows

Examples of current fellows include Peter Higgs and Jocelyn Bell Burnell. Previous fellows have included Melvin Calvin, Benjamin Franklin, James Clerk Maxwell, James Watt and Andrew Lawrence.

A comprehensive biographical list of Fellows from 1783–2002 has been published by the Society.

References

External links
  

Scottish awards
Fellows of learned societies of Scotland
Academic awards

Royal Society of Edinburgh